COSE or CoSe may refer to:
Common Open Software Environment, a 1993 Unix initiative
Council of Smaller Enterprises, a business advocacy organization in Northeast Ohio
Carbonyl selenide, a chemical compound with the formula COSe
Cobalt(II) selenide, a chemical compound with the formula CoSe
CBOR Object Signing and Encryption, security standards for the CBOR data format